George E. Staples (born November 2, 1918 in Kanosh, Utah) was a veterinary researcher in animal nutrition and diarrheal treatment, and the author of three publications of the Cooperative Extension Service, North Dakota State University. This particular research contributed to the improvement of the livestock industry in the area from the early 1970s to mid-1980s.

Early life 

He was the great-grandson of English immigrant George Staples (1834–1890), the adopted Sioux who is widely credited for making south central Utah hospitable for settlers by befriending many tribes in the area, including Pahvant Ute Chief Kanosh, for whom the town was named. The wife of the original George Staples, Lauraette Rappleye Staples (1840-1916) had died less than two years before his birth, but had so trained the mid-wife who delivered him (and many of the others with medical training in the area) with folk remedies she had learned from the local Utes and numerous pioneer companies in crossing the plains which she and her mother had provided medical assistance a decade before arriving in Kanosh that the birth was uneventful even during the peak of the 1918 influenza pandemic.

Staples growing up years were likewise unremarkable for any of his contemporaries growing up at the time—much farm work and local schooling in Kanosh and nearby Millard High School in the county seat of Fillmore, Utah. He attended Utah State Agricultural College at Logan, Utah, produced unremarkable grades, and left early to serve as a missionary of the Church of Jesus Christ of Latter-day Saints (LDS Church) in Florida and Georgia from 1939 to 1941, arriving back home in late November of that year.

Following his discharge, he graduated from Utah State Agricultural College at Logan, Utah with a B.S. in Animal Science, went on to South Dakota State College of Agricultural & Mechanical Arts at Brookings, South Dakota for his Master's Degree and finally to Colorado A&M at Ft. Collins, Colorado for his Doctorate in Veterinary Medicine.

He worked in private practice at Afton, Wyoming for a few years before landing a field position with the U.S. Department of Agriculture where he was able to work out of his hometown of Kanosh during the peak of the atomic testing in the late 1950s, by which time his family had grown to four sons and a daughter. However, by the end of that decade, some people in that area begin to show symptoms of radiation poisoning and Staples felt it prudent to move his family out in the summer of 1960. The fifth Staples son was born shortly after that move, but died in infancy.

His sixth and last son was born in Topeka, Kansas in 1962, where the family had relocated for his employment with Morris Research Laboratories, pioneers in pet nutrition and now part of the Hill's Pet Nutrition Group. Staples' work in the relatively new field attracted the attention of North Dakota State University.  He was hired and made the move there December 29, 1964.

His unique experience in private practice, USDA field work with livestock diseases and pioneering research in pet nutrition was used to improve the livestock industry in North Dakota. At least one notorious trafficker in diseased cattle was put out of business by the techniques Staples shared in early disease detection and treatment of livestock diseases, particularly calf scours.

A major breakthrough to treatment of the disease was put on the market through Staples research shortly after publication of his 1982 publication Calf scours: Causes, prevention, treatment. However, the ingredients were so simple and inexpensive that none of the major pharmaceutical companies felt it profitable to market commercially.

Illness and death 

Shortly before his retirement from the university, Staples was diagnosed with myelofibrosis from radiation exposure during his USDA field work more than a quarter century earlier.   His eldest son died at age 32 in 1983, Staples died in 1993 and his second son died from the same type of illness in 2003 at age 51.

Selected publications 

  Co-authored article on Digestion Trials (Journal of Animal Science), 1951
  Selecting healthy baby calves (Circular A-566), 1971
 The calf scour problem (Circular A-527 Rev), 1973
 Calf scours: Causes, prevention, treatment (AS-776), 1982

1918 births
Utah State University alumni
Colorado State University alumni
South Dakota State University alumni
1993 deaths
People from Afton, Wyoming